The SraC/RyeA RNA is a non-coding RNA that was discovered in E. coli during two large scale screens for RNAs. The function of this RNA is currently unknown.  This RNA overlaps the SdsR/RyeB RNA on the opposite strand suggesting that the two RNAs may act in a concerted manner.

References

External links 
 

Non-coding RNA